Rear Admiral Christopher Hugh Trevor Clayton (born 21 May 1951), is a former Royal Navy officer who served as a Lynx helicopter pilot during the Falklands War. He went on to become a senior naval officer, commanding ships during the Hong Kong handover ceremony and 2003 invasion of Iraq and later serving high-level positions in NATO.

Early career and Falklands War 

Clayton was educated at St John's School, Leatherhead. After school he joined the Royal Navy as an aviator and was appointed an acting sub-lieutenant on 29 February 1972. After flying training he was then commissioned as a sub-lieutenant on 29 November 1973. After being promoted to lieutenant on 16 October 1974, Clayton was selected for a Full Career Commission in 1980, transferring to the General List.

On 2 April 1982, the disputed British overseas territory of the Falkland Islands was invaded by neighbouring Argentina. The conflict ended that June with the surrender of the Argentine forces; the battles fought on land, at sea, and in the air had cost the lives of some 900 British and Argentine servicemen.

Cardiff arrived at the islands late in the conflict on 26 May. Cardiffs primary role was to form part of the anti-aircraft warfare picket, using her anti-air Sea Dart missiles to protect British ships and attempting to ambush Argentine re-supply aircraft. She was also required to fire at enemy positions with her 4.5-inch gun.

[[File:Lynx 335 HMS Cardiff March 1982.jpg|thumb|Clayton piloting Cardiff'''s Lynx helicopter]]
On 13 June, around midday, Clayton was performing the routine forenoon clearance search of the area south of the Falkland Sound. Two Argentine Daggers of Gaucho flight spotted Clayton's Lynx and jettisoned their external fuel tanks in preparation to engage. They began strafing the helicopter with their cannons, but Clayton evaded the attacks and managed to escape. The Daggers returned home empty-handed, their original mission had been to attack British positions on Mount Longdon with retarded bombs. After the initial Argentine surrender, Clayton flew the OC of 40 Commando, Lt Col Malcolm Hunt, to Port Howard to accept the surrender of the Argentine garrison stationed there. In recognition of his service during the war, Clayton was awarded a Mention in Dispatches.

 Commands 

Clayton was promoted to commander on 31 December 1988, then to a captain on 31 December 1995. Clayton commanded the Type 22 frigate  during the 1997 Hong Kong handover ceremony. Hong Kong had been a British colony since 1841, but Britain's lease was due to finish and control was to be handed to the People's Republic of China. Chathams role was to act as guardship for the royal yacht HMY Britannia, Clayton said of the experience; "There is no sense of withdrawal, this is very much one professional armed forces handing over the protection and sovereignty of Hong Kong to another, the People's Liberation Army. So I look on it as a classic military evolution and one which we hope to do with some style, orderly and professionally."

He became the first officer to hold the post of "Commodore Naval Aviation" (COMNA), he was based at Northwood Headquarters during this time. The post was created in 2000 to command the newly formed Joint Force Harrier. In 1998, the UK's recently elected labour government reassessed the country's defence needs and published their findings in a policy document titled the Strategic Defence Review. One of its key initiatives was a call for the amalgamation of both Royal Navy and RAF Harriers into one force. This would create a closer harmonization of common operating procedures and maintenance practice.

Clayton commanded the helicopter carrier  during the 2003 invasion of Iraq. Ocean'' was the UK's lead amphibious landing ship, providing sea-based logistics to the Royal Marine's 3 Commando Brigade and acting as a launch pad for their attack on the Al-Faw Peninsula. Her helicopters also played a role in securing the city of Basra. When interviewed about the experience Clayton said; "There's  a sense of pride in a job really well done. [Ocean] played a major role in the operations out there. But also we have to remember that we're the lucky ones coming back. Not everyone has. There are many we have to think about, including one of our ship's company who was killed in action, Marine Chris Maddison. Our thoughts will be about him and with his family."

Later career 

Clayton became a rear admiral on 30 August 2004 and took a post at NATO's headquarters in Brussels. His role was as an assistant director, in charge of the Intelligence Division of NATO's International Military Staff. The Intelligence Division provides day-to-day strategic intelligence support to the Secretary General; it has no intelligence gathering capacity of its own and therefore relies on input from alliance members. On this basis it could be described as a "central coordinating body" for the collation, assessment and dissemination of intelligence within NATO Headquarters. He retired on 29 December 2007.

Over the course of his naval career, he attended the Advanced Command and Staff Course and the Higher Command and Staff Course.

See also 
Photo of Clayton during the Falklands War

Notes

References

HMS Cardiff (D108)
People educated at St John's School, Leatherhead
Royal Navy rear admirals
Royal Navy personnel of the Falklands War
Living people
Fleet Air Arm aviators
Royal Navy personnel of the Iraq War
Helicopter pilots
1951 births